The Very Best of Barry Manilow is a compilation album released by singer and songwriter Barry Manilow in 2005 for sale at Hallmark stores.

Track listing
"Mandy" (3:30)
"I Write the Songs" (3:53)
"Even Now" (3:29)
"It's a Miracle" (3:53)
"Looks Like We Made It" (3:33)
"Could It Be Magic" (6:48)
"Halfway Over the Hill" (3:22)
"Ready to Take a Chance Again (Theme from "Foul Play") (3:01)
"Weekend in New England" (3:44)
"Daybreak" (3:07)
"All the Time" (3:16)
"I Made It Through the Rain" (4:24)
"Sunrise" (3:14)
"When October Goes" (3:58)
"This One's for You" (3:27)

References

2005 compilation albums
Barry Manilow compilation albums